Constellaria is an extinct genus of bryozoan from the Middle Ordovician to Early Silurian (510-410 million years ago) from North America, Asia and Europe. These branching coral-like bryozoans formed bushy colonies 10-15 mm (0.375-0.5 inches) across on the seabed. The fairly thick branches were erect, often compressed in one direction, and covered with distinctive tiny, star-shaped mounds called maculae or monticules (regularly shaped hummocks). Feeding zoids were located along the rays of the stars. The maculae probably formed "chimneys" for the expulsion of exhalant feeding currents from the surface of a colony, after water had been filtered to obtain food for the organisms.

Discovery
Constellaria was the first fossil bryozoan genus to be described. It was initially discovered by naturalist J.W. Van Cleve, but Cleve's work had to be finished by James Dwight Dana.

Species
C. antheloidea (Hall): Late Ordovician, Cincinnati Group, United States of America

References

Fewster, H. (ed.) 2019. Dinosaurs & prehistoric life: The definitive visual guide to prehistoric animals. Dorling Kindersley, London. ISBN 978-0-2412-8730-9
Lessem, D. 1999. Dinosaurs to dodos: An encyclopedia of extinct animals. Scholastic Inc., New York. ISBN 0-590-31684-2
Walker, C. and Ward, D. 2000. Dorling Kindersley Handbooks: Fossils. Dorling Kindersley, London. ISBN 978-1-4053-5987-0

Cystoporida
Stenolaemata genera
Prehistoric bryozoan genera
Ordovician bryozoans
Ordovician animals of Europe
Fossils of Georgia (U.S. state)
Paleozoic life of Ontario
Paleozoic life of British Columbia
Paleozoic life of Quebec
Extinct bryozoans